Dillon may refer to:

People
Dillon (surname)
Dillon (given name)
Dillon (singer) (born 1988), Brazilian singer
Viscount Dillon, a title in the Peerage of Ireland

Places

Canada
Dillon, Saskatchewan

United States 
Dillon Beach, California
Dillon, Colorado
Dillon, Illinois
Dillon, Kansas
Dillon, Missouri
Dillon, Montana
Dillon, South Carolina
Dillon County, South Carolina
Dillon, West Virginia
Dillon Falls, Ohio, also called Dillon
Dillons Run, a river in West Virginia
Dillon State Park, on the Licking River, Licking County, Ohio
Dillon Township (disambiguation)

Arts and entertainment

Fictional characters
Al Dillon, in the 1987 film Predator
Kevin Dillon (character), in the young adult novel Freak the Mighty
Matt Dillon (Gunsmoke), in the radio and television versions of Gunsmoke
The Dillon family in the soap opera All My Children:
Laurel Banning Dillon
Janet Dillon
Dillon Quartermaine, in the soap opera General Hospital
Dillon, in the television series Power Rangers RPM
Dillon, in the video game Dillon's Rolling Western

Fictional places
Dillon, Texas, the setting for the NBC television drama Friday Night Lights

Brands and enterprises
9x25 Dillon, a wildcat pistol cartridge
Dillon Aero, a manufacturing company based in Scottsdale, Arizona, United States
Rhum Dillon, a French rum distilled by Distillerie Dillon in Martinique
Dillons, an American grocery supermarket chain, part of the Kroger company
Dillons, a former UK-based chain of bookstores, now part of Waterstones

Other uses
78393 Dillon, an asteroid
Dillon Stadium, Hartford, Connecticut, United States
Dillon v. Gloss (256 U.S. 368, 1921), a United States Supreme Court case
Dillon Round of the General Agreement on Tariffs and Trade talks

See also
 
Dillian Whyte, a British professional boxer
Dillion (disambiguation)
Dillom
Dylan (disambiguation)